Pound for Pound is the ninth studio album by Royal Trux. It was released in 2000 by Drag City.

Track listing

References

External links
 

2000 albums
Royal Trux albums
Drag City (record label) albums
Domino Recording Company albums